Omar David Uresti (born August 3, 1968) is an American professional golfer who played on the PGA Tour.

Early life
Uresti was born in Austin, Texas. He attended the University of Texas in Austin and graduated in 1991 with a degree in organizational communication. He turned professional immediately after graduating.

Professional career
Uresti has two wins on the Web.com Tour: one in 1994 at the Nike Shreveport Open, and one in 2007 at the Livermore Valley Wine Country Championship. Uresti went winless in over 350 PGA Tour starts, with two third-place finishes. He says his biggest accomplishment as a golfer was making a professional record nine consecutive birdies in a round on the Nationwide Tour. After his PGA Tour career ended, he became a life member of the Southern Texas chapter of the PGA.

Uresti has had success in the PGA Professional Championship, winning it twice, in 2017 and 2021, and finishing in the top 20 in 2015, 2016, and 2018, thus qualifying for the PGA Championship in those years. A number of club professionals criticized Uresti after his 2017 win because he was a former touring professional and he did not work full-time as a golf professional. The PGA responded that Uresti was eligible as an A-3 member with more than 20 years of PGA Tour membership.

Professional wins (9)

Sunshine Tour wins (1)

Nationwide Tour wins (2)

Nationwide Tour playoff record (1–0)

Canadian Tour wins (1)

Other wins (4)
2015 Southern Texas PGA Championship
2017 PGA Professional Championship
2018 Southern Texas PGA Championship
2021 PGA Professional Championship

Senior wins (1)
2020 Senior PGA Professional Championship

Results in major championships

CUT = missed the half-way cut
"T" = tied for place
Note: Uresti only played in the PGA Championship and the U.S. Open.

Results in senior major championships

"T" indicates a tie for a place
CUT = missed the halfway cut
NT = No tournament due to COVID-19 pandemic

U.S. national team appearances
PGA Cup: 2015, 2017, 2022 (winners)

See also
1994 PGA Tour Qualifying School graduates
1995 PGA Tour Qualifying School graduates
2003 PGA Tour Qualifying School graduates
2004 PGA Tour Qualifying School graduates
2007 Nationwide Tour graduates
2009 PGA Tour Qualifying School graduates

References

External links

American male golfers
Texas Longhorns men's golfers
PGA Tour golfers
Korn Ferry Tour graduates
Golfers from Austin, Texas
1968 births
Living people